The 2019 Thailand Open, sponsored by Toyota, was a tennis tournament played on outdoor hard courts. It was the 1st edition of the Hua Hin Championships as part of the WTA International tournaments of the 2019 WTA Tour. It took place at the True Arena Hua Hin in Hua Hin, Thailand, from 28 January 2019 to 3 February 2019.

This tournament replaced the Taiwan Open on the WTA Tour.

Points and prize money

Point distribution

Prize money

Singles main draw entrants

Seeds

1 Rankings as of January 14, 2019.

Other entrants
The following players received wildcards into the singles main draw:
  Caroline Garcia
  Sabine Lisicki
  Peng Shuai

The following players received entry from the qualifying draw:
  Jennifer Brady
  Duan Yingying
  Priscilla Hon
  Chloé Paquet
  Conny Perrin
  Arantxa Rus

Withdrawals
Before the tournament
  Mihaela Buzărnescu → replaced by  Anna Blinkova
  Zarina Diyas → replaced by  Kateryna Kozlova
  Bethanie Mattek-Sands → replaced by  Monica Niculescu
  Wang Qiang → replaced by  Mandy Minella

Retirements
  Tímea Babos (dizziness)
  Zhang Shuai (illness)

Doubles main draw entrants

Seeds

1 Rankings as of January 14, 2019

Other entrants 
The following pairs received wildcards into the doubles main draw:
  Sabine Lisicki /  Ajla Tomljanović
  Nudnida Luangnam /  Peangtarn Plipuech

Champions

Singles

  Dayana Yastremska def.  Ajla Tomljanović, 6–2, 2–6, 7–6(7–3).

Doubles

  Irina-Camelia Begu /  Monica Niculescu def.  Anna Blinkova /  Wang Yafan, 2–6, 6–1, [12–10].

References

External links
Official website
WTA profile

 
 WTA Tour
 in women's tennis
Tennis, WTA Tour, Thailand Open
Tennis, WTA Tour, Thailand Open

Tennis, WTA Tour, Thailand Open
Tennis, WTA Tour, Thailand Open